Baklava (or) is a layered pastry dessert made of filo pastry, filled with chopped nuts, and sweetened with syrup or honey. It was one of the most popular sweet pastries of Ottoman cuisine.

The pre-Ottoman origin of the dish is unknown, but, in modern times, it is a common dessert of Turkish, Iranian and Arab cuisines, and other countries of the Levant and Maghreb, along with the South Caucasus, Balkans,  Somalia and Central Asia.

Etymology
The name baklava is used in many languages with minor phonetic and spelling variations.

Historian Paul D. Buell argues that the word "baklava" may come from the Mongolian root  'to tie, wrap up, pile up' composed with the Turkic verbal ending -v; baγla- itself in Mongolian is a Turkic loanword. Sevan Nişanyan considers its oldest known forms (pre-1500) to be baklağı and baklağu, and labels it as being of Proto-Turkic origin. Another form of the word is also recorded in Persian, . Though the suffix -vā might suggest a Persian origin, the baqla- part does not appear to be Persian and remains of unknown origin. The word changes as  >  > .

The Arabic name   likely originates from Turkish.

History
Although the history of baklava is not well documented, its current form was probably developed in the imperial kitchens of the Topkapı Palace in Constantinople (modern Istanbul).

There are also claims attributing baklava to the Assyrians, according to which baklava was already prepared by them in the 8th century BC.

It consists of layers of filo dough that are put one by one in warmed up milk with sugar. It is served with walnut and fresh pomegranate and generally eaten during Ramadan.

Placenta cake theory
The word "placenta" originally comes from the Greek language , which means something "flat and broad". Although there are no surviving recipes for Greek , the term is known from the work of comic poet Antiphanes, quoted by Athenaeus:

"The streams of the tawny bee, mixed with the curdled river of bleating she-goats, placed upon a flat receptacle of the virgin daughter of Demeter [honey, cheese, flour], delighting in ten thousand delicate toppings – or shall I simply say plakous?" "I'm for plakous"' (Antiphanes quoted by Athenaeus 449c).

The earliest known recipe from the 2nd century BC that resembles baklava is Ancient Roman placenta cake, a honey-covered baked layered-dough dessert which Patrick Faas identifies as the origin of baklava:
"The Greeks and the Turks still argue over which dishes were originally Greek and which Turkish. Baklava, for example, is claimed by both countries. Greek and Turkish cuisine both built upon the cookery of the Byzantine Empire, which was a continuation of the cooking of the Roman Empire. Roman cuisine had borrowed a great deal from the ancient Greeks, but placenta (and hence baklava) had a Latin, not a Greek, origin—please note that the conservative, anti-Greek Cato left us this recipe."

Cato's original recipe for placenta follows:

Dalby speculates as to why Cato's section on bread and cakes, which he describes as "recipes in a Greek tradition", are included in :

We cannot be so sure why there is a section of recipes for bread and cakes (74-87), recipes in a Greek tradition and perhaps drawing on a Greek cookbook. Possibly Cato included them so that the owner and guests might be entertained when visiting the farm; possibly so that proper offerings might be made to the gods; more likely, I believe, so that profitable sales might be made at a neighbouring market.

According to a number of scholars  was a precursor of modern baklava. Historian Speros Vryonis describes koptoplakous as a "Byzantine favorite" and "the same as the Turkish baklava", as do other writers. The name is used today on the island of Lesbos for thin layered pastry leaves with crushed nuts, baked, and covered in syrup.

Persian 

Baklava is a common dessert in modern Arab cuisines, but the Arabic language cookbook , compiled by Ibn Sayyar al-Warraq in the 10th-century, does not contain any recipe for baklava. Its recipe for lauzinaj refers to small pieces of almond paste wrapped in very thin pastry ("as thin as grasshoppers' wings") and drenched in syrup. Some writers say this is dessert that most closely resembles the modern baklava. Charles Perry, however, has written that "it was not much like baklava".

Written in 1226 in today's Iraq, the cookbook was based on an earlier collection of 9th century Persian-inspired recipes. According to Gil Marks, Middle Eastern pastry makers later developed the process of layering the ingredients.

Central Asian layered desserts

Preparation

Baklava is normally prepared in large pans. Many layers of filo dough, separated with melted butter and vegetable oil, are laid in the pan. A layer of chopped nuts—typically walnuts or pistachios, but hazelnuts are also sometimes used—is placed on top, then more layers of filo. Most recipes have multiple layers of filo and nuts, though some have only top and bottom pastry.

Before baking (30 minutes), the dough is cut into regular pieces, often parallelograms (lozenge-shaped), triangles, diamonds or rectangles. After baking, a syrup, which may include honey, rosewater, or orange flower water is poured over the cooked baklava and allowed to soak in.

Baklava is usually served at room temperature, and is often garnished with ground nuts.

Regional variations

There are many regional variations of baklava. In Greece, walnuts are more common than pistachios, and the dessert is often flavored with cinnamon. In Iran, fragrant cardamom is added to a sweetened walnut filling.
In Gaziantep, locally grown pistachios are used, and the dessert is often served with kaymak cream.

Algeria

Baklava in Algeria is called Baklawa (Arabic: بقلاوة). In most Algerian regions, Baklawa is the centerpiece of any sweets table. This Baklawa originates in the Algerian city of Constantine. The Algerian Baklawa is distinct in that filo dough is not used, Instead, it is made up of multiple layers of very thin dough that has been meticulously handcrafted.

It's stuffed with ground almonds and walnuts and flavored with orange blossom water before being cooked and drizzled in pure honey.

Armenia

In Armenian cuisine, pakhlava is spiced with cinnamon and cloves. Greek-style baklava is supposed to be made with 33 dough layers, referring to the years of Christ's life.

Azerbaijan

Azerbaijani pakhlava, or simply Pakhlava, are a type of baklavas made in Azerbaijan for Nowruz holiday, although not baked only for holidays. Yeasty pastry, hazelnuts or Circassian walnut, milled clove, cardamom, and saffron are used for the preparation of pakhlava. Milled nuts and sugar are used for stuffing.

The diamond shape of pakhlava is commonly associated with a star or fire in Azerbaijan. Azerbaijani pakhlava is multilayered and commonly prepared with walnuts or almonds and flavored with saffron. It is generally made in a big baking tray. Pakhlava has some variations in different regions of Azerbaijan based on the ingredients and baking techniques.

A layer is rolled out from the pastry with thickness of not less than 2 mm, put into baking tray, oiled and lavishly filled with stuffing. This process is continued, until 9–10 layers are made. Another version uses 14 layers. The last layer is greased with yolk, mixed up with saffron. Then pakhlava is cut into two rhombus, then either hazelnut or half of the kernel of Circassian walnut is placed on each piece. Then it is baked with 180–200 °C temperature pending 30–40 minutes.

Baku pakhlava. Baku pakhlava can be made of peeled almonds or walnuts. It consists of 8–10 layers. Its top layer is coated with saffron mixed with yolk. A half walnut or pistachio is placed on the center of the top layer of each diamond-shaped piece. Syrup or honey is poured on the surface of pakhlava 15 minutes before it is ready.
Ganja pakhlava. Ganja pakhlava is characterized by its stuffing prepared of almond, sugar and cinnamon, baking on a copper tray over a campfire and consisting of 18 layers of pastry. 8 layers of almond stuffing are spread on every 3 buttered layers of pastry. The surface is coated with egg. Syrup is added to Ganja pakhlava 15–20 minutes before it is ready. Infusion of rose petals (gulab) can also be added to the dough, and cardamom is added to the stuffing.
Rishta pakhlava. This kind of pakhlava differs from the other types with its top layer which is covered with rishta. Rishta is made from wheat starch or rice flour. Grid-shaped rishta made by pouring knead liquid dough on hot griddle through a special funnel with 11 holes and baking it in a minute.
Guba pakhlava. This type of pakhlava is characterized especially by its colour. The covering layer of Guba pakhlava is coated with a mixture of saffron and a red colour additive. Guba pakhlava consists of approximately 50 rishta layers.
Sheki pakhlava. It is also called Sheki halva. It is made from rishta, stuffing (hazelnut, cardamom and coriander seeds) and syrup.

Balkans

In Bosnian cuisine, Ružice is the name of the regional variant of baklava.

In Romania, some Turkish pastry shops that sell baklava have notable popularity. They are common in the south and southeast of the country, but some also exist in its east.

Greece 
In Greece, baklava is supposed to be made with 33 dough layers, referring to the years of Jesus's life.

Iranian

In Iranian cuisine, a drier version of baklava is cooked and presented in smaller diamond-shaped cuts flavored with rose water. The cities of Yazd and Qazvin are famous for their baklava, which is widely distributed in Iran. Persian baklava uses a combination of chopped almonds and pistachios spiced with cardamom and a rose water-scented syrup and is lighter than other Middle Eastern versions.

Turkey

In Turkish cuisine, baklava is traditionally made by filling between the layers of dough with pistachios, walnuts or almonds (in some parts of the Aegean Region).

In the Black Sea Region hazelnuts are commonly used as a filling for baklava. Hazelnuts are also used as a filling for the Turkish dessert Sütlü Nuriye, a lighter version of the dessert which substitutes milk for the simple syrup used in traditional baklava recipes.
Şöbiyet is a variation that includes fresh cream in the filling, in addition to the traditional nuts.

The city of Gaziantep in south-central Turkey is famous for its pistachio baklava. The dessert was introduced to Gaziantep in 1871 by Çelebi Güllü, who had learned the recipe from a chef in Damascus. Gaziantep baklava is the first Turkish product to receive a protected designation from the European Commission.

Other

There are many variants in Maghrebi cuisine as well (from east Algeria).

Gallery

See also

 Mille-feuille
 
 
 List of desserts
 List of pastries

Notes

General references 

 Reuven Amitai-Preiss and David O. Morgan, eds., The Mongol Empire and Its Legacy Brill, 1999. .
 Buell, Paul D. "Mongol Empire and Turkicization: The Evidence of Food and Foodways", p. 200ff, in Amitai-Preiss, 1999.
 Christian, David. Review of Amitai-Preiss, 1999, in Journal of World History 12:2:476 (2001).
 Perry, Charles. "The Taste for Layered Bread among the Nomadic Turks and the Central Asian Origins of Baklava", in A Taste of Thyme: Culinary Cultures of the Middle East (ed. Sami Zubaida, Richard Tapper), 1994. .
 Roden, Claudia. A New Book of Middle Eastern Food. .
 Vryonis, Speros, The Decline of Medieval Hellenism in Asia Minor, 1971. Quoted in Perry (1994).
 Wasti, Syed Tanvir (March 2005), "The Ottoman Ceremony of the Royal Purse", Middle Eastern Studies 41:2:193–200

External links 

Nut dishes
Arab cuisine
Azerbaijani cuisine
Balkan cuisine
Iranian cuisine
Middle Eastern cuisine
Ottoman cuisine
Algerian cuisine
Tunisian cuisine
Uzbekistani cuisine
Turkish desserts
Greek desserts
Armenian desserts
Albanian cuisine
Honey dishes